The Battle of Nanchang was a military campaign fought around Nanchang, Jiangxi between the Chinese National Revolutionary Army and the Japanese Imperial Japanese Army in the Second Sino-Japanese War. It was the first major conflict to occur following the Battle of Wuhan.

Background 
Following the Fall of Nanjing, the Imperial Japanese Navy Air Force launched long-distance pre-emptive strikes from newly captured airbases in Nanjing against targets in Nanchang, including the primary Chinese Air Force base at Qingyunpu. Despite heavy losses of many of the Chinese Air Force's top veteran fighter pilots and most of the equipment over the course of the Battle of Shanghai, Battle of Taiyuan, and Battle of Nanjing, the Chinese Air Force was revitalized through the Sino-Soviet Non-Aggression Pact, and the Chinese pilots along with the Soviet Volunteer Group of pilots continued to put up resistance in the air over Nanchang as the Japanese continued to bomb and soften the defenses there.

After the capture of Wuhan by the Japanese, Wuhan became the base of the Eleventh Army of the Imperial Japanese Army, in the former location of the Fifth and Ninth War Zones of the National Revolutionary Army. Nanchang was a railway hub and the western terminus of the Chekiang-Hunan Railway, being a major supply line between the Third and Ninth War Zones. In addition, it was the location of airfields that threatens shipping routes along the Yangtze River.

The Nationalist government reorganized the chain of command in the Ninth War Zone, with Chen Cheng remaining in the nominal post while Xue Yue was assigned to conduct the actual operations. Shortly before the beginning of the campaign, the Chinese forces amassed 200,000 troops from 52 divisions near Nanchang, but due to logistics the reorganization were largely ineffective.

Prelude

Battle of Xiushui River 
Back in July 1938, Japanese troops had attempted to approach Nanchang during their assault on Wuhan, but their advance were stopped by the Chinese defenders at the Xiushui River. The Chinese positions were well entrenched, blocking the path to Nanchang for the Japanese troops. For the rest of the year, the stalemate continued as both sides remained standstill on each side of the river.

In the spring of 1939, the Japanese troops with their new reinforcements began their new offensive toward Nanchang. On 20 March, the Japanese troops under the direct command of Yasuji Okamura launched heavy artillery shelling over Chinese fortifications on the other side of the Xiushui River. The Japanese sappers under the cover of artillery fire were able to set up bridges quickly which allowed the Japanese tanks to be deployed across the river, decimating the Chinese forces in the process. Two days later, the strategic location of Wucheng, located at where Xiushui River enters Poyang Lake, sustained heavy naval bombardment and airstrikes by the Japanese navy and fell shortly after to the Special Naval Landing Forces on 23 March.

In addition to conventional artillery fire, the Japanese bombardment also utilized toxic gas produced by Unit 731, which had been deployed occasionally in the China field of operations.

Order of battle at the battle of Xiushui River 
The Japanese Army used the "6th Field Heavy Artillery Brigade" artillery unit under the command of Major Gen. Sumita. This force consisted of the following artillery sections:

13th Field Heavy Artillery Regiment (Lt. Col. Okoshi, 24 Type 4 15 cm Howitzers)
14th Field Heavy Artillery Regiment (Lt. Col. Maruyama, 24 Type 4 15 cm Howitzers)
10th Field Heavy Artillery Regiment (Lt. Col. Nagaya, 24 Type 4 15 cm Howitzers)
15th Independent Field Heavy Artillery Regiment (Col. Horikawa, 16 Type 14 10 cm Cannons)
2nd Independent Heavy Artillery Battalion (Lt. Col. Manba, 4 Type 89 15 cm Cannons)
101st Field Artillery Regiment (Lt. Col. Yamada, 34 Type 38-improved 75mm Field Guns)
3rd Independent Mountain Gun Regiment (Lt. Col. Morikawa, 24 Type 41 75 mm Mountain Guns)
106th Field Artillery Regiment (Lt. Col. Uga, 32 Type 38-improved 75mm Field Guns)
2nd Battalion/2nd Independent Mountain Gun Regiment (Major Matsumoto, 12 Type 41 75 mm Mountain Guns)

Battle

Japanese attack 
By 26 March, the Japanese troops supported by tanks had broken out of their Xiushui River bridgehead and reached the west gate of Nanchang, defeating Chinese reinforcements from the Third War Zone. Yasuji Okamura's troops were joined by another Japanese regiment striking south from the north of Nanchang, and the converged Japanese forces began surrounding and laying siege to the city. The city of Nanchang fell the next day, with the Chinese defenders suffering heavy casualties. The Japanese Army continued to clear out the rural area throughout March and April, marking the end of the first phase of the campaign.

The Japanese used chemical weapons against Chinese forces who lacked chemical weapons in order to compensate for when they were numerically inferior, whenever Chinese were defeating the Japanese in hand to hand combat. The Japanese did not dare to use gas against the Americans because the Americans had their own chemical weapons stockpile and the Japanese feared retaliation.

Poison gas was used by the Japanese when they were losing hand to hand combat against the Chinese in the Nanchang sector in 1939. The Japanese were routed and fled 3 miles after being defeated in hand to hand fighting by Chinese forces in Yichun, Jiangxi which was located on the Nanchang-Jiujiang railway. The Japanese had to deploy their naval fleet and naval air force to break through the booms of Wuxue and Jiujiang in order to threaten Hankou. Fierce blood hand to hand fighting took place at Nanchang in 1939. In one raid over 50 Japanese soldiers were killed in a barracks in hand to hand fighting and when it was set on fire.

Freda Utley said that the Japanese were inferior at hand to hand combat against the Chinese at the battle of Hankou, but the Japanese used poison gas to win at the battles of Hankou and Nanchang. Freda Utley interviewed Cantonese general General Li Hanyuan and saw captured war booty taken from dead Japanese soldiers at the battle of Hankow, including Japanese charms, "thousand stich belts", officers' swords, field glasses, flags, gas masks, rifles, machine guns, letters and diaries from Japanese officers like a captain .The Japanese captain's diary was filed with despair and belief that Japan would not win the war. Freda Utley then interviewed Guangxi clique general Li Zongren after he defeated the Japanese at Taierzhuang, who noted his troops were superior in hand to hand combat against the Japanese but the Japanese could not deploy heavy artillery, and that the Japanese were only winning at Wuhan because the Japanese were mass deploying mustard gas and tear gas against Chinese troops who totally lacked gas masks.

At Huangmei, in fierce hand to hand fighting the Japanese were fought to a standstill by the Chinese in 1938 during the battle of Wuhan.

Chinese counterattack and retreat 
Despite losing the city of Nanchang to the Japanese, Chinese forces in Jiangxi continued to make a stand. During a period lasting until the end of April some Japanese forces were moved to support operations in other areas (see Battle of Suizao). The Chinese Nationalists saw an opportunity in this weakening of available Japanese manpower, and planned a counterattack to retake the city. Their directive was to cut off the Japanese contact and disrupt the enemy from the rear.

On 21 April, a surprise attack by the forces of the Third and Ninth War Zones began from the north, west, and south of Nanchang. It began with the 1st Army Group in the 60th Army Division as well as the 58th Army Division attacking from the North. They were later joined by the 74th and 49th Army Groups as they pushed in through Japanese defenses. In the south, this sudden offensive quickly broke through the Japanese positions as they advanced towards Nanchang proper. After five days of relentless advancement, the 32nd Army Group at the front of the Southern Chinese spearhead reached the outer area of Nanchang. Throughout the Chinese attack, the Japanese still retained control over the Xiushui River and continually received supplies and reinforcements throughout the five-day advance of Chinese troops.

Beginning on 27 April, the Japanese began a counteroffensive against the Chinese push by attacking the southern troops. Supported by heavy artillery fire, and air support the Japanese retook several of their strongholds around the city and forced the Chinese divisions to fall back. For the following week, progress was at a standstill on both sides as they held their defensive positions. Hoping to end the conflict quickly, Chiang Kai-shek ordered the Chinese divisions surrounding Nanchang on 2 May to retake the city by 5 May.

Following this order, the Chinese launched a new offensive to try to end the conflict over the city, but the continued reinforcements of the Japanese were unable to be pushed back. After several days of intense fighting, and heavy casualties for the Chinese army, the Chinese were exhausted and forced to retreat on 9 May. Also exhausted from the battle, the Japanese did not pursue the retreating Chinese army.

Aftermath 
Casualties for the fighting around Nanchang have been reported as 51,328 killed or wounded for the Chinese, and 24,000 for the Japanese. After the fall of Nanchang, the Japanese consolidated their control of Jiangxi and Hunan region. The Nationalists however continued to maintain their presence in the area. The Japanese momentum were further interrupted by the border clashes with the Soviet Union, which broke out shortly after in the Battles of Khalkhin Gol.

See also 
 Order of Battle, Battle of Nanchang

References

Bibliography 

 
 
 
 
 
 

Conflicts in 1939
1939 in China
1939 in Japan
Nanchang 1939
Military history of Jiangxi
Nanchang
March 1939 events
April 1939 events
May 1939 events